Anushka Maldonado (born 29 September 1995) is a Puerto Rican basketball player for San Sebastián and the Puerto Rican national team.

She participated at the 2018 FIBA Women's Basketball World Cup.

References

1995 births
Living people
Basketball players at the 2019 Pan American Games
Basketball players from Washington (state)
Guards (basketball)
Pan American Games medalists in basketball
Puerto Rican women's basketball players
Pan American Games bronze medalists for Puerto Rico
Medalists at the 2019 Pan American Games